The Musketawa Trail is a rail trail in Western Michigan along the former Muskegon, Grand Rapids and Indiana Railroad line.  Stretching  from Marne to Muskegon, the trail passes through the towns of Conklin and Ravenna.  Trail development came from the Michigan Department of Natural Resources and the Friends of the Musketawa Trail.

Waypoints
Waypoints for the Musketawa Trail.
↑ in the Distance column points to the other waypoint that the distance is between.

References

External links

Musketawa Trail, Michigan – A1 Trails
MiOttawa – Ottawa County Parks
Musketawa Trail – Bed & Breakfast, Lodging, Camping, Attractions

Protected areas of Muskegon County, Michigan
Protected areas of Ottawa County, Michigan
Rail trails in Michigan
National Recreation Trails in Michigan